is a Japanese professor and administrator known as "the father of Internet in Japan" and "Internet Samurai". He is a professor at Keio University. Murai is the founder of JUNET and founder of the WIDE Project. Murai graduated from Keio University in 1979 and received a Ph.D. from the same school in 1984. On October 1, 2009, Murai became the Dean of the Faculty of Environment and Information Studies.

Murai was awarded the 2011 IEEE Internet Award "For his leadership in the development and deployment of the global Internet, especially across the Asia-Pacific region.” Murai entered the Internet Hall of Fame in 2013, recognizing his administrative and co-ordination efforts in establishing Internet connectivity in Japan, and serving as President of Japan Network Information Center.

Jun Murai accepted the Knight of the Legion of Honour Medal from the French government on 13 February 2019.

References

External links 

 Jun Murai

Internet pioneers
Internet in Japan
Japanese computer scientists
1955 births
Living people
Keio University alumni
Academic staff of Keio University